The National Farm Machinery Show is an agricultural machinery exposition held annually in February indoors at the Kentucky Exposition Center in Louisville, Kentucky, United States.

The show started as an electricity demonstration and exhibit in 1963, and adopted the name National Farm Machinery Show in 1966.

The National Farm Machinery Show includes the Championship Tractor Pull, an annual event since 1969.

See also
List of attractions and events in the Louisville metropolitan area

References

External links
 
 Championship Tractor Pull Official Website

Events in Louisville, Kentucky
Agricultural shows in the United States
Recurring events established in 1963
1963 establishments in Kentucky
Agricultural machinery
February events